C'mon You Know is the third solo studio album by English musician Liam Gallagher, released on 27 May 2022 through Warner Records. Andrew Wyatt served as the album's primary producer and co-writer. It was preceded by lead single "Everything's Electric", co-written by Dave Grohl, which charted at #18 on the UK Singles Chart, becoming Gallagher's first solo single to reach the UK Top 20. "C'mon You Know", "Better Days","Diamond in the Dark" and "Too Good for Giving Up" were also subsequently released as singles. The album was released the same day as Gallagher's second live album Down by the River Thames. Gallagher will tour Europe in support of the album.

C'mon You Know received generally positive reviews from critics and became Gallagher's fourth solo album to debut at #1 on the UK Albums Chart, attaining silver certification in its first week, and subsequently being certified gold in 2022.

Background
Gallagher announced the album in October 2021, whereupon he stated the song "More Power" was dedicated to his brother Noel, calling it "a naughty little tune" but "lovely". The cover is a photograph of "fans in the pit" at one of Gallagher's shows that was taken at the Reading Festival 2021.

Critical reception

C'mon You Know received generally positive reviews from critics, with many positive reviews praising its new direction and increased depth. At review aggregator Metacritic, the album received a score from 74 out of 100 based on twelve critics' reviews, indicating "generally favorable" reception. Robin Murray of Clash called it "the broadest of Liam Gallagher's three solo albums, and also the deepest. It's the one in which he learns to bare his soul a little, and accept different influences." Jordan Bassett of NME found it to be Gallagher's "best and most experimental solo album yet", writing that he does not "overthink this third record, which is packed with Summer of Love anthems".

Writing for The Independent, Helen Brown opined that "There's so much sheer, on-one attitude in Gallagher's parka pastichery that's hard to resist. His band are on fire with it. Riffs skirling from the guitars. Drums constantly a-quiver. [...] Fans will only need to give this album a couple of spins before they'll be set to sing along in the festival fields." Reviewing the album for Classic Rock, Ian Fortnam called the album "a bit of a cracker, finding a 'repentant' Liam [...] gleefully infuriating his usual detractors (with 'Diamonds In The Dark''s 'Now I know how many holes it takes to...' hook), delivering catnip ballads ('Too Good For Giving Up'), hitting all the right Liam Gallagher buttons ('Don't Go Halfway') and occasionally kicking hand-me-down Stonesy arse".

Track listing

Personnel
Musicians

 Liam Gallagher – vocals (all tracks), percussion (8), drums (9)
 Andrew Wyatt – acoustic guitar (1, 11, 12), electric guitar (1–3, 6, 10–14), Hammond organ (1, 3, 14), piano (1, 3, 4, 6, 10, 11, 13), sound effects (1, 2), synthesizer (1–3, 6, 8, 10, 14), bass (2–4, 6, 9, 14), drums (2, 6), Mellotron (2, 4, 14), backing vocals (3, 6, 9, 13, 14), drum programming (3), harmonica (4, 8); Moog, Pianet piano (4); organ (6), percussion (6, 8, 11), string arrangement (8, 11), woodwind arrangement (9), melodica (10)
 Andy Waterworth – bass (1, 5, 8, 9, 11)
 Dom Kelly – bass (1, 5, 8, 9, 11)
 Ezra Koenig – bass (1, 5, 8, 9, 11), saxophone (4, 9); piano, synthesizer (9)
 Stephen Street – bass (1, 5, 8, 9, 11)
 Emile Haynie – drum programming (1, 2), sound effects (2)
 Dan McDougall – drums (1, 3–6, 14), shaker (3), percussion (4, 5, 8), bass (5)
 Mike Moore – electric guitar (1, 3, 4, 8, 14), twelve-string guitar (3), acoustic guitar (8, 12), fuzz guitar (9, 12)
 Adam Noble – programming (1, 4–6, 8, 10, 12, 14)
 Ivan Hussey – cello (1, 5, 8, 9, 11), string arrangement (5)
 Maria Collette – cello (1, 5, 8, 9, 11)
 Natalie Rozario – cello (1, 5, 8, 9, 11)
 Nick Holland – cello (1, 5, 8, 9, 11)
 Eliza Marshall – flute (1, 5, 8, 9, 11)
 Helen Sanders-Hewitt – viola (1, 5, 8, 9, 11)
 Jordan Bergmans – viola (1, 5, 8, 9, 11)
 Nicola Hicks – viola (1, 5, 8, 9, 11)
 Úna Palliser – viola (1, 5, 8, 9, 11)
 Dan Oates – violin (1, 5, 8, 9, 11)
 Eos Counsell – violin (1, 5, 8, 9, 11)
 Gareth Griffiths – violin (1, 5, 8, 9, 11)
 Gillon Cameron – violin (1, 5, 8, 9, 11)
 Henry Salmon – violin (1, 5, 8, 9, 11)
 Honor Watson – violin (1, 5, 8, 9, 11)
 Jonathan Hill – violin (1, 5, 8, 9, 11)
 Katie Sharp – violin (1, 5, 8, 9, 11)
 Laura Melhuish – violin (1, 5, 8, 9, 11)
 Lizzie Ball – violin (1, 5, 8, 9, 11)
 Richard George – violin (1, 5, 8, 9, 11)
 Sally Jackson – violin (1, 5, 8, 9, 11)
 Stephen Hussey – violin (1, 5, 8, 9, 11)
 Violeta Barrena – violin (1, 5, 8, 9, 11)
 Althea Edwards – choir (1, 4, 13)
 Angel Williams-Silvera – choir (1, 4, 13)
 Hannah Khemoh – choir (1, 4, 13)
 Joel Bailey – choir (1, 4, 13)
 Kieran Briscoe – choir (1, 4, 13)
 Maleik Loveridge – choir (1, 4, 13)
 Naomi Parchment – choir (1, 4, 13)
 Nicky Brown – choir (1, 4, 13)
 Olivia Williams – choir (1, 4, 13)
 Paul Boldeau – choir (1, 4, 13)
 Paul Lee – choir (1, 4, 13)
 Philly Lopez – choir (1, 4, 13)
 Rebecca Folkes – choir (1, 4, 13)
 Renee Fuller – choir (1, 4, 13)
 Teniola Abosede – choir (1, 4, 13)
 Yasmin Green – choir (1, 4, 13)
 Simon Aldred – acoustic guitar (5)
 B. J. Cole – pedal steel guitar (5)
 Christian Madden – piano (5)
 Dave Grohl – drums (7)
 Greg Kurstin – bass, electric guitar, keyboards, percussion (7, 11); drums, tambura (11)
 Ariel Rechtshaid – drum programming, Mellotron, upright bass (9)
 Bobby Krlic – string arrangement (9)
 Brad Truax – bass (10)
 Gunnar Olsen – drums (10)
 Danny L Harle – musical consultation (10), Mellotron (11)
 Julian Burg – drum programming (11)
 Nick Zinner – electric guitar (11)

Technical

 Randy Merrill – mastering
 Mark "Spike" Stent – mixing
 Adam Noble – engineering (1, 2, 4, 5, 8–14)
 Will Purton – engineering (3, 4, 10), vocal engineering (3), engineering assistance (1, 8, 11, 13, 14)
 Felipe Gutierrez – engineering (4), engineering assistance (3, 5, 14)
 Andrew Wyatt – engineering (6, 10, 12–14), engineering assistance (1)
 Greg Kurstin – engineering (7, 11)
 Julian Burg – engineering (7, 11)
 Matt Tuggle – engineering (7), additional engineering (11)
 Matt Wolach – engineering (7), mixing assistance (all tracks)
 Connor Panayi – engineering (10), engineering assistance (11)
 Kyle Paas – engineering (10)
 Alex Ferguson – engineering assistance (1, 4, 5, 8, 10–14)
 Jedidiah Rimell – engineering assistance (4, 5, 8, 10–14)

Charts

Weekly charts

Year-end charts

Certifications

References

2022 albums
Albums produced by Andrew Wyatt
Albums produced by Ariel Rechtshaid
Albums produced by Danny L Harle
Albums produced by Emile Haynie
Albums produced by Greg Kurstin
Liam Gallagher albums
Warner Records albums